This list of Heritage New Zealand-listed places in Christchurch contains those buildings and structures that are listed, or were listed in early 2011, with Heritage New Zealand (formerly known as Historic Places Trust) in Christchurch, New Zealand. The list is confined to the boundaries of Christchurch prior to amalgamation with the Banks Peninsula District in March 2006.

Heritage New Zealand-listed places in Christchurch
There are two registers of heritage places in Christchurch. One is the national register administered by Heritage New Zealand and the other is the register in the Christchurch City Plan. The scope of this article is the Heritage New Zealand register only.

There are four parts to the national register; historic places, historic areas, Wahi Tapu (places sacred to Māori) and Wahi Tapu areas. Christchurch has listings in the former two categories. , there were 315 historic places and seven historic areas listed. In August 2011, Heritage New Zealand started the process of removing listings of buildings demolished after the earthquakes, starting with the Manchester Courts and the NZ Trust and Loan Building entries.

Heritage loss
Some of the listed buildings suffered damage to varying degrees in the 4 September 2010 Canterbury earthquake. Manchester Courts in the central city was the only listed building that was demolished after that earthquake.

This was only the beginning of a loss of heritage, however; the situation was entirely different when the 22 February 2011 Christchurch earthquake occurred, with some of the listed buildings damaged, and many more lost or to be lost as a result of action by Civil Defence after the earthquake, and the Canterbury Earthquake Recovery Authority's clearance and redevelopment plans. Some heritage buildings fully collapsed during the earthquake, for example the Durham Street Methodist Church (killing three workers), the Stone Chamber of the Canterbury Provincial Council Buildings, the Oxford Terrace Baptist Church and the Sevicke Jones building in Cathedral Square. Other listed buildings partially collapsed, or were badly damaged, including ChristChurch Cathedral, the Cathedral of the Blessed Sacrament and Holy Trinity Avonside.

Many heritage buildings have been demolished since, others are yet to be demolished, with the fate of some buildings not yet decided. Category I buildings in central Christchurch demolished since the earthquake include the Cranmer Centre (the former site of the Christchurch Girls' High School), the Guthrey Centre in City Mall, and The Press Building. Category II buildings in central Christchurch that have been demolished include St Elmo Courts and Wharetiki House. There is a long list of heritage buildings that are yet to be demolished, including the façade of Clarendon Hotel that is part of the Clarendon Tower.

Heritage restoration
Three listed heritage statues fell off their plinths; Scott Statue, Godley Statue (restored in 2016) and Rolleston Statue (restored in 2016), with the latter receiving significant damage (the head broke off).

Category I heritage listings that have received significant damage, but where the owners have declared that they will be repaired, include the Christchurch Arts Centre and the Excelsior Hotel. The future of a number of heritage buildings is as yet undecided. In 2013, the Registry Building of the Arts Centre reopened after a complete renovation and strengthening. In 2014, the Isaac Theatre Royal reopened after a $40m restoration. During 2016, the Mona Vale homestead was reopened. It is predicted that during 2017, many restored heritage buildings will reopen. This will include the Sign of the Kiwi, the Sign of the Takahe, the gatehouse of Mona Vale, the Edmonds' Band Rotunda, the Old Stone House, the former Trinity Church, and Shand's Emporium.

List of historic places

Churches and religious centres

Monuments and memorials

Current and former homes

Other

List of lost historic places
The following listings have been lost; most of them due to the Christchurch earthquakes.

List of historic areas

See also
2010 Canterbury earthquake
2011 Christchurch earthquake
June 2011 Christchurch earthquake
List of historic places in Dunedin

References

External links
Ceismic database which holds all the HNZ entries of demolished heritage buildings that have since been removed from the HNZ website

2010 in New Zealand
2011 Christchurch earthquake
Christchurch
History of Christchurch